Giulio Paolini (born 5 November 1940) is an Italian artist associated with both Arte Povera and Conceptual Art.

Biography
Paolini was born in Genoa. After a childhood spent in Bergamo, he moved with his family to Turin where he still lives today. He attended the Giambattista Bodoni State Industrial Technical School of Graphics and Photography, graduating in the Graphics department in 1959. He had been interested in art from an early age, visiting museums and galleries and reading art periodicals. Towards the end of the 1950s he approached painting, trying some pictures of an abstract nature, close to monochrome. The discovery of modern graphics during his studies and the fact that there were architecture magazines around the house – his elder brother Cesare (1937–1983) was an architect and designer of the Sacco chair – contributed to orienting him towards a line of research aimed at zeroing the image.

He did his first work in 1960, Disegno geometrico (Geometrical Drawing), his precocious artistic expression which consists of the squaring of 8 marks made by pencil and compass and 3 elongated ink lines stretching the entirety of a white tempera background on canvas. Each intersecting line crosses two mirrored marks and the center, dividing the canvas into 8 geometric sections with varying points of symmetry. This preliminary gesture above any other artwork is the representation that would remain the point of "eternal recurrence" in the universe of Paolini's thoughts: Its creation and evaluation by Paolini was the topical moment and original instant that revealed the artist to himself, representing his focus and innovation in conceptual art and becoming the conceptual foundation of all his future work. Paolini would want to say that no work he could ever do would surpass Disegno geometrico conceptually, and that every work he had and would make would both intentionally and unintentionally callback to it as the root of his artistic vision. He put forth the idea that he can't and has no intention of trying to escape Disegno geometrico, it set him off in a course as a conceptual artist that can't really be stopped.

In the early 1960s, Paolini developed his research by focusing on the very components of the picture: on the painter's tools and on the space of representation. For his first solo show – in 1964 at Gian Tommaso Liverani's La Salita gallery in Rome – he presented some rough wooden panels leant against or hanging on the wall, suggesting an exhibition in the process of being set up. The show was seen by Carla Lonzi and Marisa Volpi who would shortly afterwards write the first critical texts on the young artist. In 1965 Paolini began to use photography, which allowed him to extend his inquiry to the relationship between artist and work (Delfo, 1965; 1421965, 1965). In the same year, through Carla Lonzi, he met Luciano Pistoi, owner of the Galleria Notizie in Turin, who introduced him to a new circle of friends and collectors and became his main dealer until the beginning of the 1970s.

Between 1967 and 1972, the critic Germano Celant invited him to take part in Arte Povera exhibitions which resulted in his name being associated with that movement. In fact Paolini's position was clearly distinct from the vitalistic climate and "existential phenomenology" that distinguished the propositions of Celant's artists. He repeatedly declared an intimate belonging to the history of art, identifying programmatically with the lineage of all the artists who had preceded him. Some of his best known works can be traced back to this purpose, extraneous to the militant scene of the late 1960s: Giovane che guarda Lorenzo Lotto (Young Man Looking at Lorenzo Lotto, 1967), the "self-portraits" from Poussin and Rousseau (1968) and the pictures in which he reproduces details of old masters' paintings (L'ultimo quadro di Diego Velázquez, 1968; Lo studio, 1968). Among Paolini's main references in those years were Jorge Luis Borges, to whom he paid homage on several occasions, and Giorgio de Chirico from whom he borrowed the constituent phrase of the work Et.quid.amabo.nisi.quod.ænigma est (1969).

His first official acknowledgements came with the 1970s: from shows abroad, which placed him on the international avant-garde gallery circuit, to his first museum exhibitions. In 1970 he took part in the Venice Biennale with Elegia (Elegy, 1969), the first work in which he used the plaster cast of a classic subject: the eye of Michelangelo's David with a fragment of mirror applied to the pupil. One of the outstanding themes in this decade was a backward glance at his own work: from literal citation of celebrated paintings he arrived at self-citation, proposing a historicizing in perspective of his oeuvre. Works such as La visione è simmetrica? (Is Vision Symmetrical?, 1972) or Teoria delle apparenze (Theory of Appearances, 1972) allude to the idea of the picture as potential container of all past and future works. Another theme investigated with particular interest in this period was that of the double and the copy, which found expression above all in the group of works entitled Mimesi (Mimesis, 1975–76) consisting of two plaster casts of the same classical statue set face to face, calling into question the concept of reproduction and representation itself.

The period most dense in exhibitions and retrospectives, with the publication of important monographs, was the 1980s. In the first half of the decade an explicitly theatrical dimension began to establish itself with works marked by fragmentation and dispersion (La caduta di Icaro, 1982; Melanconia ermetica, 1983) or distinguished by theatrical figures such as eighteenth century valets de chambre (Trionfo della rappresentazione, 1984). Paolini's poetics was considerably enriched by literary attributions and mythological references, as well as by the introduction of cosmic images. In the late 1980s the artist's reflections turned mainly on the very act of exhibiting. Starting with his solo show at the Musée des Beaux-Arts in Nantes (1987) the concept of the exhibition – its premises and its promises – became progressively configured as the actual subject of the works themselves.

In the course of the 1990s, further inquiry into the idea of exhibiting spread into other, new modalities. The increasingly complex set-ups often followed a typology that was additive (seriality, juxtaposition) or centrifugal (dispersion or dissemination from a central nucleus) or centripetal (concentration and implosive superimposition). The place of the exhibition became the stage par excellence of the "theatre of the opus", meaning of the work in its doing and undoing: the place that defined the very eventuality of its happening (Esposizione universale, 1992; Teatro dell'opera, 1993; Essere o non-essere, 1995). Completion of the work was moreover constantly deferred, leaving the spectator in perennial expectation: just what the artist always feels from the start at his worktable, waiting for the work to manifest itself.

In the 2000s, another theme especially dear to Paolini took on special importance, as much in his artwork as in his writings: the identity of the author, his condition as spectator, his lack of contact with a work that always precedes and supersedes him.

Paolini's poetics and artistic practice as a whole may be characterised as a self-reflective meditation on the dimension of art, on its timeless "classicality" and its perspective without vanishing point. By means of photography, collage, plaster casts and drawing his intention is always to inquire, with great conceptual rigour, into the tautological and at the same time metaphysical nature of artistic practice.

Exhibitions

Paolini's first exhibition in La Salita (Rome, 1964), "consisted of raw wood panels hung on, or leaning against, walls, giving the gallery the appearance of being in the midst of a show being hung". In his 1965 exhibit at the Galleria Notizie he showcased 11 works, one of which was Disegno geometrico during its formal debut. Since the Galleria Notizie show  Paolini has exhibited in art galleries and museums worldwide. In 1971, Paolini had an exhibition by the title of Un Quadro, where he showcased 14 photographic replications of Disegno geometrico, the works were showcased around the exhibition leading the audience to cycle through the varying forms of the precocious work being cited. According to art historian, Fabio Belloni, this was the first time an artist in the Italian conversation of art and artistic expression has cited a previous iteration of their own work with such explicit language and visuals, juxtaposing not only the 14 replications shown in Un Quadro, but also Disegno geometrico. In terms of conceptual callbacks, this exhibition is a reflection of Paolini's artistic vision of fragmented pieces as not just part of a whole but as a whole in it of itself; further considering that he sees Disegno geometrico as the original and unavoidable referent of all his subsequent works, Un Quadro completes its bold conceptual objective of circling back and re-establishing his origin.

Collaboration with avant-garde Italian galleries of the 1960s and 1970s solidified Paolini's role as an essential Italian artist of the time: (La Salita, Rome; Galleria Notizie, Turin; Galleria dell'Ariete, Milan; Galleria del Leone, Venice; La Tartaruga, Rome; L'Attico, Rome; Studio Marconi, Milan; Modern Art Agency, Naples) was swiftly integrated with regular presence in important foreign galleries (from 1971 Paul Maenz, Cologne; from 1972 Sonnabend, New York City; from 1973 Annemarie Verna, Zurich; from 1976 Yvon Lambert, Paris; from 1977 Lisson Gallery, London). Since the 1980s Paolini has mainly been represented by the galleries Christian Stein, Milan; Massimo Minini, Brescia; Alfonso Artiaco, Naples; Yvon Lambert, Paris and Marian Goodman, New York City.

The great anthological exhibitions took off towards the late 1970s (Istituto di Storia dell'Arte dell'Università di Parma, Parma, 1976; Städtisches Museum, Mönchengladbach, 1977; Mannheimer Kunstverein, Mannheim, 1977; Museo Diego Aragona Pignatelli Cortes, Naples, 1978; Stedelijk Museum, Amsterdam, touring to The Museum of Modern Art, Oxford, 1980) and culminated in the second half of the 1980s (Le Nouveau Musée, Villeurbanne, 1984, touring to Montreal, Vancouver and Charleroi; Neue Staatsgalerie, Stuttgart, 1986; Castello di Rivoli, Rivoli, 1986; Galleria Nazionale d'Arte Moderna, Rome, 1988; Galleria Comunale d'Arte Moderna, Villa delle Rose, Bologna, 1990). Outstanding recent solo shows were held in Graz (Neue Galerie im Landesmuseum Joanneum, 1998), Turin (Galleria Civica d'Arte Moderna e Contemporanea, 1999), Verona (Galleria d'Arte Moderna e Contemporanea Palazzo Forti, 2001), Milan (Fondazione Prada, 2003), Winterthur (Kunstmuseum Winterthur, 2005) and Münster (Westfälisches Landesmuseum für Kunst und Kulturgeschichte, 2005). For the season 2002/2003 in the Vienna State Opera Giulio Paolini designed a large scale picture (176 sqm) as part of the exhibition series "Safety Curtain", conceived by museum in progress.

Group exhibitions, innumerable since his participation in the 1961 Premio Lissone, include the shows connected with Arte Povera (1967–1971, 1984–85, 1997, 2001–02), the main international exhibitions of Italian art and many of the most significant shows dedicated to artistic development in the second half of the 20th century (for example: Vitalità del negativo, Rome 1970; Contemporanea, Rome 1973; Projekt '74, Cologne 1974; Europe in the Seventies, Chicago and touring through the United States 1977–78; Westkunst, Cologne 1981; '60–'80': Attitudes/concepts/images, Amsterdam 1982; An International Survey of Recent Painting and Sculpture, New York City 1984; The European Iceberg, Toronto 1985; Transformations in Sculpture, New York City 1985; Bilderstreit, Cologne 1989; 1965–1975: Reconsidering the Object of Art, Los Angeles 1995; The Last Picture Show: Artists Using Photography, 1960–82, Minneapolis and touring 2003–05). Paolini has appeared several times at documenta Kassel (1972, 1977, 1982, 1992) and the Venice Biennale (1970, 1976, 1978, 1980, 1984, 1986, 1993, 1995, 1997). In 2014, the Whitechapel Gallery in London staged Giulio Paolini: To Be or Not To Be, an exhibition of Paolini's sculptures, exhibitions and installations. "Giorgio De Chirico-Giulio Paolini Giuilo Paolini Giorgio De Chirico" Center for Italian Modern Art, 13 Oct. 2016-June 24, 2017, New York, NY, italianmodernart.org

Set design

In the course of his career Paolini has also worked in the theatre, from the sets and costumes for Vittorio Alfieri's Bruto II, directed by Gualtiero Rizzi (1969), to his collaboration with Carlo Quartucci and the Zattera di Babele in the 1980s. Outstanding recent projects include the sets for Wagner's Die Walküre (2005) and Parsifal (2007) at the Teatro di San Carlo in Naples, directed by Federico Tiezzi.

Bibliography

Right from the start Paolini's productions have been accompanied by written reflections and comments, seen as elements complementary to and parallel with the image. His first collection of texts, Idem, was published by Einaudi in 1975 with an essay by Italo Calvino. Recent collections include Quattro passi. Nel museo senza muse (Einaudi, Turin 2006) and Dall'Atlante al Vuoto (in ordine alfabetico) published by Mondadori Electa, Milan 2010. In 1995 Maddalena Disch edited a complete edition of his writings and interviews (Giulio Paolini: la voce del pittore. Scritti e interviste 1965–1995, ADV Publishing House, Lugano).

The first monograph on the artist, by Germano Celant, was published in 1972 in New York City by Sonnabend Press. The most significant books on Giulio Paolini, including critical anthologies and a wealth of documentation, are the catalogues brought out on the occasion of his solo shows in Parma (1976), Ravenna (1985, Giulio Paolini. Tutto qui, Edizioni Essegi, Ravenna), Stuttgart (1986), Rome (1988), Graz (1998) and Milan (2003). In 1990 Francesco Poli edited a monograph for Edizioni Lindau of Turin. In 1992 Marco Noire published Impressions graphiques. L'opera grafica 1967–1992 di Giulio Paolini, a general catalogue of his prints and multiples. In 2008 the publisher Skira of Milan brought out a two volume Catalogue Raisonné of Paolini's works from 1960 to 1999, edited by Maddalena Disch.

References

External links
 Official website

1940 births
Living people
Artists from Genoa
Arte Povera
Italian conceptual artists
Italian contemporary artists
20th-century Italian painters
Italian male painters
21st-century Italian painters
20th-century Italian sculptors
20th-century Italian male artists
Italian male sculptors
21st-century Italian sculptors
21st-century Italian male artists